Angels Sing is a 2012 Christmas family drama film directed by Tim McCanlies and starring Harry Connick Jr., Connie Britton, Chandler Canterbury, Fionnula Flanagan, Lyle Lovett, Willie Nelson and Kris Kristofferson. It is an adaptation of Turk Pipkin's 1999 novel When Angels Sing.

Plot
History professor Michael (Harry Connick Jr.) as a child loved Christmas, but as an adult is less than enthused about it. His family tries to get him, his wife and ten year old to also do Christmas with them at Thanksgiving, but he refuses.

Upset, his son David goes outside. There, Michael tells him the story of how he had his holiday spirit crushed. He and his brother David snuck out to go skating at the lake near their grandfather's. They suffered a tragic accident when they started racing. His brother realised the ice started to crack near the center, and he flung Michael to the edge, falling through himself.

Right after Michael and his wife are told the house they are renting has been sold, he has an accident mountain biking, caused by a reindeer, and is forced to walk his bike home. Seeing a house for sale, he stops and the owner Nick (Willie Nelson) invites him to come see it. Impulsively, he offers Michael the house, although he only pay half of what it's worth, under two conditions. He must accept immediately and upkeep it in line with the neighborhood.

As an adult, Michael still can't find the joy of Christmas, as he blamed himself for his big brother's death. So, their being barraged with carolers and holiday decorations upon their arrival, and for days and days makes him exasperated. He stockpiles them in the attic, as he refuses to put them up. Then, Michael's dad has a car accident while bringing David home. the child gets a concussion, his grandfather doesn't make it.

Michael's son David, facing the tragedy of his grandfather's death and blaming himself, motivates Michael to find his holiday spirit again. He gets a push in the right direction when he finds Nick again. He tells him that happy memories are the important ones. Michael seeks the help of his neighbor Griffin (Lyle Lovett) to help him decorate the house. Finally, David leaves his room, sees the lights and helps his dad turn them on. We see Michael's old home videos and see the face of Nick on the Santa he visits, the same who helps him find the joy of Christmas again.

Cast

 Harry Connick Jr. as Michael Walker
 Connie Britton as Susan Walker
 Chandler Canterbury as David Walker
 Fionnula Flanagan as Ma
 Lyle Lovett as Griffin
 Willie Nelson as Nick
 Kris Kristofferson as The Colonel
 Dana Wheeler-Nicholson as Maggie
 Brennan Barker as Young Michael 
Deborah Cole as Theresa

Soundtrack
 Track list

See also
 List of Christmas films

References

External links
 
 
 
 
 

2012 films
2010s Christmas drama films
American Christmas drama films
Films based on American novels
Films directed by Tim McCanlies
Films produced by Elizabeth Avellán
Films shot in Texas
Lionsgate films
2012 drama films
2010s English-language films
2010s American films